The unqualified term instability strip usually refers to a region of the Hertzsprung–Russell diagram largely occupied by several related classes of pulsating variable stars: Delta Scuti variables, SX Phoenicis variables, and rapidly oscillating Ap stars (roAps) near the main sequence; RR Lyrae variables where it intersects the horizontal branch; and the Cepheid variables where it crosses the supergiants.

RV Tauri variables are also often considered to lie on the instability strip, occupying the area to the right of the brighter Cepheids (at lower temperatures), since their stellar pulsations are attributed to the same mechanism.

Position on the HR diagram 

The Hertzsprung–Russell diagram plots the real luminosity of stars against their effective temperature (their color, given by the temperature of their photosphere). The instability strip intersects the main sequence, (the prominent diagonal band that runs from the upper left to the lower right) in the region of A and F stars (1–2 solar mass) and extends to G and early K bright supergiants (early M if RV Tauri stars at minimum are included).  Above the main sequence, the vast majority of stars in the instability strip are variable.  Where the instability strip intersects the main sequence, the vast majority of stars are stable, but there are some variables, including the roAp stars.

Pulsations
Stars in the instability strip pulsate due to He III (doubly ionized helium). In normal A-F-G stars He is neutral in the stellar photosphere. Deeper below the photosphere, at about 25,000–30,000K, begins the He II layer (first He ionization).  Second ionization (He III) starts at about 35,000–50,000K.

When the star contracts, the density and temperature of the He II layer increases. He II starts to transform into He III (second ionization). This causes the opacity of the star to increase and the energy flux from the interior of the star is effectively absorbed. The temperature of the star rises and it begins to expand. After expansion, He III begins to recombine into He II and the opacity of the star drops. This lowers the surface temperature of the star. The outer layers contract and the cycle starts from the beginning.

The phase shift between a star's radial pulsations and brightness variations depends on the distance of He II zone from the stellar surface in the stellar atmosphere. For most Cepheids, this creates a distinctly asymmetrical observed light curve, rising rapidly to maximum and falling slowly back down to minimum.

Other pulsating stars
There are several types of pulsating star not found on the instability strip and with pulsations driven by different mechanisms.  At cooler temperatures are the long period variable AGB stars.  At hotter temperatures are the Beta Cephei and PV Telescopii variables.  Right at the edge of the instability strip near the main sequence are Gamma Doradus variables.  The band of White dwarfs has three separate regions and types of variable: DOV, DBV, and DAV (= ZZ Ceti variables) white dwarfs.  Each of these types of pulsating variable has an associated instability strip created by variable opacity partial ionisation regions other than helium.

Most high luminosity supergiants are somewhat variable, including the Alpha Cygni variables.  In the specific region of more luminous stars above the instability strip are found the yellow hypergiants which have irregular pulsations and eruptions.  The hotter luminous blue variables may be related and show similar short- and long-term spectral and brightness variations with irregular eruptions.

References

Hertzsprung–Russell classifications
Stellar evolution